Ateshkadeh-ye Olya (also Romanized as Āteshkadeh-ye ‘Olyā; also known as Āteshkadeh-ye Bālā) is a village in Meyghan Rural District, in the Central District of Nehbandan County, South Khorasan Province, Iran. At the 2006 census, its population was 77, in 18 families.

References 

Populated places in Nehbandan County